At least six Fireboats in Toronto have helped protect the city's waterfront and maritime commerce.

References

Fireboats of Toronto Fire Services
Water transport in Toronto